SeatGuru.com was a website that featured aircraft seat maps, seat reviews, and a color-coded system to identify superior and substandard airline seats. It also featured information about in-flight amenities and airline specific information regarding check-in, baggage, unaccompanied minors and traveling with infants and pets.

Each seat is color-coded, with green being a "good seat", red being a "poor seat", and yellow being a "be aware" seat, meaning that it has a deficiency such as less legroom. SeatGuru at one point had information on more than 1,200 aircraft seat maps from more than 175 airlines.

History
The website was launched in October 2001 by frequent business traveler Matthew Daimler.

In 2003, the website was enrolled in Google AdSense to generate revenue.

In 2007, SeatGuru was acquired by the Tripadvisor division of Expedia Group.

In December 2011, Expedia completed the corporate spin-off of  Tripadvisor.

Awards
 Travel + Leisure Top Travel Websites of 2008
 2007 Webby Awards Honoree, Travel category

Accuracy
SeatGuru does not hold up to date information for British Airways seat plans, or aircraft allocated to flights. Since March 2019, SeatGuru has not updated United seating charts for PremiumPlus configured 777/200-300 aircraft.

As of 2020 it is no longer available in the Apple App store and Google Play.

As of September 2021 attempting to contact the site via "Contact Me" to update seat maps results in the reply "Thank you for your interest in SeatGuru. Currently we are not making additional updates to our content on the site and are unable to provide other support.  -SeatGuru".

References

External links
 

Tripadvisor
American travel websites
American companies established in 2001
Transport companies established in 2001
Internet properties established in 2001
2007 mergers and acquisitions
Airliner seating